South Slavey may refer to:

The South Slavey people, or Slavey
The Slavey language